Union Township is a township in Polk County, Iowa, United States.

Its elevation is listed as 942 feet above mean sea level.

History
Union Township was established after 1880.

References

Townships in Polk County, Iowa
Townships in Iowa